Nathaniel Reed may refer to:
Nathaniel C. Reed  (c. 1810–1853), Ohio Supreme Court justice  
Nathaniel Reed (outlaw) (1862–1950)
Nathaniel Reed (environmentalist) (1933–2018)

See also
Nathan Reed, a minor character on Angel